Filipina singer and actress Angeline Quinto has received several awards and nominations for her work in music and on screen. She rose to prominence after winning the television talent show Star Power in 2011. She signed with Star Music and collaborated with songwriter and producer Jonathan Manalo for her self-titled debut studio album released that same year. Quinto won Best New Artist at the Aliw Awards for the album, and was a recipient of the Star Awards for New Female Recording Artist of the Year and Song of the Year for her debut single "Patuloy Ang Pangarap". In 2012, she released her second studio album Fall In Love Again. It garnered her a Box Office Entertainment Award for Female Recording Artist of the Year. At the 26th Awit Awards, she won Best Song Written for a Movie/TV/Stage Play for the single "Nag-iisang Bituin", and Best Inspirational Recording for her collaboration with Regine Velasquez on "Lipad ng Pangarap".

The same year, Quinto made her television debut in an episode of the anthology series Maalaala Mo Kaya, for which she portrayed an indigenous woman who falls in love with a man outside her tribe. She played her first leading role on feature film in Jerome Pobocan's romantic comedy-drama Born to Love You (2012). Quinto's first starring role on television was in the romantic comedy series Kahit Konting Pagtingin (2013); playing a waitress who pretends as her patron's fiancée. She won a Golden Screen TV Award for Breakthrough Performance by an Actress for her role. She followed this with supporting parts in Cathy Garcia-Molina's ensemble comedy Four Sisters and a Wedding and Joyce Bernal's romantic comedy Bakit Hindi Ka Crush ng Crush Mo? In 2014, she released her third studio album Higher Love. For her work, she received five nominations at the 6th Star Awards for Music, winning Female Pop Artist of the Year.

Quinto co-headlined a concert, titled Royals, in February 2016. She won Best Major Concert Collaboration at the  29th Aliw Awards and Female Concert Performer of the Year at the 48th Box Office Entertainment Awards for the production. She had two film releases that year, including the independent film Malinak Ya Labi which premiered at the 2016 Cinema One Originals Film Festival. In 2017, she starred as a desperate woman determined to find companionship in Joel Lamangan's comedy drama Foolish Love. She had two television appearances that year; a guest role in the action drama series Ang Probinsyano and as a panelist in the music game show I Can See Your Voice. Quinto then released here fourth studio album @LoveAngelineQuinto (2017). It garnered her four nominations at the 2018 Star Awards for Music, including a win for Female Artist of the Year. Three years later, she co-starred in the drama series Huwag Kang Mangamba and became a mentor in the reality talent show Dream Maker.

Filmography

Film
{| class="wikitable sortable plainrowheaders"
|+ 
|- style="background:#ccc; text-align:center;"
! scope="col" | Year
!scope="col"| Title
!scope="col"| Role
!scope="col" class="unsortable" | Notes
!scope="col" class="unsortable" | 
|-
|2012
!scope=row| Born to Love You
| 
|
|style="text-align:center;"|
|-
|2013
!scope=row| Four Sisters and a Wedding
| 
|
|style="text-align:center;"|
|-
|2013
!scope=row| Bakit Hindi Ka Crush ng Crush Mo?
| 
|
|style="text-align:center;"|
|-
|2014
!scope=row| Beauty in a Bottle
| 
|
|style="text-align:center;"|
|-
|2016
!scope=row| That Thing Called Tanga Na
| 
|
|style="text-align:center;"|
|-
|2016
!scope=row| Malinak Ya Labi
| 
|
|style="text-align:center;"|
|-
|2017
!scope=row| Foolish Love
| 
|
|style="text-align:center;"|
|}

Television
{| class="wikitable sortable plainrowheaders"
|+ 
|- style="background:#ccc; text-align:center;"
! scope="col" | Year
!scope="col"| Title
!scope="col"| Role
!scope="col" class="unsortable" | Notes
!scope="col" class="unsortable" | 
|-
|2011
!scope=row| ASAP Rocks
| 
| Host
|style="text-align:center;"|
|-
|2012
!scope=row| Maalaala Mo Kaya
| 
| 
|style="text-align:center;"|
|-
|2012
!scope=row| Princess and I
| 
| Cameo
|style="text-align:center;"|
|-
|2013
!scope=row| Wansapanataym
| 
| Episode: "Ang Bagong Kampeon sa Bagong Taon"
|style="text-align:center;"|
|-
|2013
!scope=row| Kahit Konting Pagtingin
| 
|
|style="text-align:center;"|
|-
|2013
!scope=row| Maalaala Mo Kaya
| 
| Episode: "Ang Tahanan Mo"
|style="text-align:center;"|
|-
|2014
!scope=row| Maalaala Mo Kaya
| 
| Episode: "Train"
|style="text-align:center;"|
|-
|2014
!scope=row| Nathaniel
| 
| Guest role

|style="text-align:center;"|
|-
|2016
!scope=row| Maalaala Mo Kaya
| 
| Episode: "Oblivious"
|style="text-align:center;"|
|-
|2017
!scope=row| Maalaala Mo Kaya
| align=center|
| Episode: "Mesa"
|style="text-align:center;"|
|-
|2017
!scope=row| I Can See Your Voice
| 
| Panelist
|style="text-align:center;"|
|-
|2017
!scope=row| Ang Probinsyano
| 
| Guest role
|style="text-align:center;"|
|-
|2021
!scope=row| Tawag ng Tanghalan
| 
| Judge
|style="text-align:center;"|
|-
|2021
!scope=row| Huwag Kang Mangamba
| 
|
|style="text-align:center;"|
|-
|2021
!scope=row| Maalaala Mo Kaya
| 
| Episode: "Bigas" and "Titulo"
|style="text-align:center;"|
|-
|2021
!scope=row| Dream Maker
| 
| Mentor
|style="text-align:center;"|
|}

Awards and nominations

Notes

References

External links
 

Lists of awards received by Filipino actor
Lists of awards received by Filipino musician
Actress filmographies
Philippine filmographies